Herbert Kappler (23 September 1907 – 9 February 1978) was a key German SS functionary and war criminal during the Nazi era. He served as head of German police and security services (Sicherheitspolizei and SD) in Rome during the Second World War and was responsible for the Ardeatine massacre.

Following the end of the war, Kappler stood trial in Italy and was sentenced to life imprisonment. He escaped from prison shortly before his death in West Germany in 1978.

Early life
Kappler was born to a middle-class family in Stuttgart in what was still the German Empire. 

Herbert Kappler joined the Nazi Party on 1 August 1931 and joined the SS in 1933. In January 1936, he was assigned to duty at the Gestapo main office in Stuttgart. In 1937, Kappler graduated from the Führerschule der Sicherheitspolizei (Leadership School of the Security Police) in Berlin as a Kriminalkommissar (criminal commissioner). In 1938, during the Anschluss, he supervised the mass deportations of Austrian Jews as part of the Holocaust in Austria.

Kappler was posted to Rome as head of the Sicherheitsdienst (SD) and, from the beginning of the Second World War, he cooperated closely with the Italian police.

Chief of Police in occupied Rome
In retaliation for the armistice between Italy and the Allies on 8 September 1943, the German military occupied Rome and Kappler was appointed as Chief of the Security Police and Security Service (Oberbefehlshaber des Sicherheitspolizei und SD) for all SS and Order Police (Ordnungspolizei) units deployed in Rome.

Kappler was immediately put in charge of implementing the Holocaust in Italy in both Rome and Lazio; in his first action, 1,023 Roman Jews were rounded up and deported to Auschwitz; where only 16 survived. He later arranged the deportation of a further 993 Roman Jews, nearly all of whom also died in the gas chambers. As part of the latter operation, Kappler successfully extorted 50 kilograms of gold (110 lbs.) from the Jews of Rome, which Kappler later alleged was an attempt to prevent the deportations.

By early 1944, Kappler was the highest representative of the Reich Security Main Office in Rome and answered directly to both the military governorship, under Luftwaffe General Kurt Mälzer, as well as the SS chain of command under the Higher SS and Police Leader of Italy, SS-Obergruppenführer Karl Wolff.

Kappler came into direct conflict with the neutral Vatican under Pope Pius XII, which Kappler correctly believed was harbouring escaped Allied POWs, members of the Italian Resistance, and Jews. A particularly detested adversary of Kappler's was Irish Monsignor Hugh O'Flaherty of the Sacred Congregation De Propaganda Fide. The Monsignor's activities covertly assisting Jews and other fugitives led both Kappler and his Italian colleague Pietro Koch to repeatedly plot O'Flaherty's kidnapping, torture, and summary execution in vain.

Meanwhile, Kappler's moles inside the Vatican included an Estonian national and former Byzantine Rite seminarian from the Russicum named Alexander Kurtna, who worked from 1940 until 1944 as a translator for the Vatican's Congregation for the Eastern Churches. During those same years, Kurtna covertly spied for the Soviet Union, with devastating results for the many underground priests and faithful whose names he passed to the NKVD. Kurtna, who was always loyal to the USSR, only started to also spy for Nazi Germany in 1943 because his new handler, Kappler, repeatedly threatened to otherwise send Kurtna and his wife to a concentration camp. Kurtna, however, turned the tables on Kappler by stealing the top secret Sicherheitsdienst codebooks from his office during the chaos that surrounded the Liberation of Rome. Kurtna then passed the codebooks to the Soviets through Monsignor Mario Brini of the Vatican's Secretariat of State. Ironically, Kurtna's Soviet masters failed to appreciate or reward his loyalty. Kurtna was last seen in 1948 by Fr. Walter Ciszek as a fellow political prisoner in the Gulag complex located 300km above the Arctic Circle and known as Norillag.

Kappler organised the Ardeatine massacre, in which 335 Italian civilians were killed on 24 March 1944 in response to a direct order from Adolf Hitler to "kill 100 Italians for each German", in retaliation for an attack by the Italian Resistance that had resulted in the deaths of 33 men of the SS Police Regiment Bozen's garrison in Rome.

Criminal conviction

Kappler was arrested by British authorities in 1945, turned over to the Italian government in 1947, and tried the following year. Kappler's second in command in Rome, SS-Captain Erich Priebke, managed to escape to Argentina and was not extradited to Italy to face trial over his own role in the Ardeatine Caves Massacre until 1996.

In 1948, Kappler was tried by an Italian Army military tribunal and sentenced to life imprisonment in the Gaeta military prison. Kappler's first wife divorced him while he was serving his sentence. He later remarried Anneliese Kappler, a nurse with whom he had carried on a lengthy correspondence, in a prison wedding ceremony in 1972. By this time, Kappler had also converted to Catholicism, due to the influence of his war-time enemy, Mgr. Hugh O'Flaherty, who also often visited him in prison, and with whom Kappler often discussed literature and religion.

In 1975, at the age of sixty-eight, Kappler was diagnosed with terminal cancer. Appeals by both his wife and the West German government for compassionate release were denied by Italian authorities, but did earn him a transfer to a hospital in 1976. 

Due to Kappler's deteriorating condition and his wife's nursing skills, Anneliese Kappler had been allowed almost unlimited access to him.

Despite demands that Kappler be returned to Italy the West German authorities refused to extradite him and did not prosecute Kappler for any further war crimes, reportedly owing to ill-health. Vittorio Lattanzio resigned from his position as Minister of Defense in the aftermath of the escape.

Six months after his escape, Kappler died at home in Soltau, on 9 February 1978, aged 70.

In film and drama
In the 1973 feature film Massacre in Rome, which deals with the Ardeatine massacre, Kappler was portrayed by actor Richard Burton.

Kappler was portrayed by Christopher Plummer in the 1983 TV film The Scarlet and The Black, which detailed Kappler's first meeting with Monsignor Hugh O'Flaherty.

Kappler's post-war time seeking asylum in the Vatican, and his resultant friendship with his former enemy Monsignor O'Flaherty, was dramatised in the radio play The Scarlet Pimpernel of the Vatican by Robin Glendinning. The radio play was first broadcast on 30 November 2006 on UK BBC Radio 4. It was later performed live under the name Kingfishers Catch Fire.

See also
 Military history of Italy during World War II

References

Bibliography 
 Fabio Simonetti, Via Tasso: Quartier generale e carcere tedesco durante l’occupazione di Roma, Odradek, Roma, 2016.

External links

 SS service record of Herbert Kappler, National Archives and Records Administration, College Park, Maryland
 (The Simon Wiesenthal Center )

1907 births
1978 deaths
Converts to Roman Catholicism
Deaths from cancer in Germany
Escapees from Italian detention
Germans convicted of war crimes committed in Italy during World War II
German escapees
German extortionists
German police officers convicted of murder
Gestapo personnel
German people imprisoned abroad
Holocaust perpetrators in Austria
Holocaust perpetrators in Italy
Military personnel from Stuttgart
Nazis convicted of war crimes
Prisoners sentenced to life imprisonment by Italy
People from the Kingdom of Württemberg
SS-Obersturmbannführer
Prisoners and detainees of the British military